HTTP Message Body is the data bytes transmitted in an HTTP transaction message immediately following the headers if there are any (in the case of HTTP/0.9 no headers are transmitted).

HTTP message
The request/response message consists of the following:

 Request line, such as GET /logo.gif HTTP/1.1 or Status line, such as HTTP/1.1 200 OK, 
 Headers
 An empty line
 Optional HTTP message body data

The empty line must consist of only  and no other whitespace.

The "optional HTTP message body data" is what this article defines.

Response example
This could be a response from the web server:

HTTP/1.1 200 OK
Date: Sun, 10 Oct 2010 23:26:07 GMT
Server: Apache/2.2.8 (Ubuntu) mod_ssl/2.2.8 OpenSSL/0.9.8g
Last-Modified: Sun, 26 Sep 2010 22:04:35 GMT
ETag: "45b6-834-49130cc1182c0"
Accept-Ranges: bytes
Content-Length: 12
Connection: close
Content-Type: text/html

Hello world!

The message body (or content) in this example is the text Hello world!.

See also
 HTTP
 HTTP compression
 List of HTTP headers
 List of HTTP status codes 
 Web cache

Application layer protocols
Hypertext Transfer Protocol
Internet protocols
Network protocols
World Wide Web Consortium standards